Lille Airport  is an airport located in Lesquin,  south-southeast of Lille, a city in northern France. It is also known as Lille-Lesquin Airport or Lesquin Airport. Lille is the principal city of the Lille Métropole, the capital of the Nord-Pas de Calais region and the prefecture of the Nord department.

The airport is 15 minutes from the city centre of Lille. It is the 12th busiest French airport in number of passengers: around 970,000 passengers in 2001 and 1,397,637 passengers in 2012. In terms of cargo, it ranks fourth, with almost 38,000 tonnes passing through each year.

Airlines and destinations
The following airlines operate regular scheduled and charter flights to and from Lille Airport:

Statistics

Ground transportation
There is a shuttle bus between the Airport and Lille Flanders railway station.

References

External links

 
 

Airports in Hauts-de-France
Transport in Lille
Buildings and structures in Lille